Wufengshania is an extinct genus of bothriolepidid placoderm from the Emsian epoch of China. The type species, Wufengshania magniforaminis was named by Zhaohui Pan et al., 2018.

Taxonomy

Species 
A single species of Wufengshania magniforaminis has been described so far. W. magniforaminus fossil remains are found in Emsian Late Devonian strata of China.

Along with Bothriolepis, this genus belongs to bothriolepididae, and considered as the sister group of Vietnamaspis.

See also
List of placoderms

References

Antiarchi
Placoderms of Asia
Late Devonian first appearances
Late Devonian animals
Emsian extinctions
Fossil taxa described in 2018